Lightning Comics may refer to:
 Lightning Comics (1940-1942), an Ace Magazines comic starring Lash Lightning
 Lightning Comics (1967), a defunct comic book company
 Lightning Comics (1990s), an independent comic book company